General Pieter Grobbelaar,  (16 September 1908 – 22 June 1988) was a South African military commander. He served as Army Chief of Staff from 1953 to 1958, and Commandant General of the South African Defence Force from 1961 to 1965.

Military career
Grobbelaar joined the South African Army as a part-time Citizen Force soldier in 1929 and became a full-time Permanent Force member in 1933.

During the Second World War, Grobbelaar commanded the 7th Reconnaissance Battalion as a lieutenant colonel, and was second-in-command of the 12th Motorised Brigade, 6th Armoured Division during the Italy.

After the war, Grobbelaar served as Officer Commanding Orange Free State Command, Northern Transvaal Command and the South African Military College.

Grobbelaar served as Army Chief of Staff from 1953 to 1958, as Inspector-General from 1958 to 1959, as Deputy Commandant-General from 1959 to 1960, and as Commandant General of the South African Defence Force from 1961 to 1965.

References

|-

|-

1908 births
1988 deaths
Afrikaner people
South African people of Danish descent
South African people of Dutch descent
South African people of German descent
Companions of the Distinguished Service Order
South African military personnel of World War II
Chiefs of the South African Army
Graduates of the Staff College, Camberley